Aabra is an uninhabited village in Rõuge Parish, Võru County, in southeastern Estonia.

There is a  lake named Lake Aabra and two hills Jaanimägi and Pähkünämägi located on the village.

References

Villages in Võru County
Former villages